Mario Brunetta (born January 25, 1967) is a Canadian-born Italian former professional ice hockey goaltender. He played 40 games in the National Hockey League with the Quebec Nordiques between 1987 and 1989. The rest of his career, which lasted from 1987 to 2003, was mainly spent in Europe. Internationally Brunetta played for the Italian national team in several tournaments, including the 1998 Winter Olympics and three World Championships.

Playing career
Brunetta was born in Quebec City, Quebec. As a youth, he played in the 1979 and 1980 Quebec International Pee-Wee Hockey Tournaments with a minor ice hockey team from Quebec City.

Brunetta was drafted 162nd overall by the Quebec Nordiques during the 1985 NHL Entry Draft. Following three years in the Quebec Major Junior Hockey League he was promoted to the Fredericton Express of the AHL. He had a 4-1 start with the Express and was promoted to the Nordiques where he played 29 games that season. During the next two seasons he spent the majority of his time in the AHL and was eventually released. He pursued a career in Europe, playing for teams in Italy, Germany and Sweden.

Career statistics

Regular season and playoffs

International

References

External links
 

1967 births
Living people
Asiago Hockey 1935 players
Canadian expatriate ice hockey players in Italy
Canadian expatriate ice hockey players in Germany
Canadian expatriate ice hockey players in Sweden
Canadian ice hockey goaltenders
Canadian sportspeople of Italian descent
Eisbären Berlin players
ERC Ingolstadt players
Fredericton Express players
Frölunda HC players
Halifax Citadels players
HC Varese players
Ice hockey people from Quebec City
Ice hockey players at the 1998 Winter Olympics
Italian ice hockey goaltenders
Laval Titan players
Olympic ice hockey players of Italy
Quebec Nordiques draft picks
Quebec Nordiques players
Quebec Remparts players